is a Japanese manga series written and illustrated by Ayano Yamane. It was serialized in the monthly manga magazine Chara Selection from 2004 to 2021.

Plot
Vald, the prince of Alsvieth, is forced by circumstance to use his family's cursed sword, and so he seeks out the services of Halvir, a sorcerer, to help him lift the curse in exchange for the sword. The curse is unknown to Vald, but it manifests itself as turning Vald into a bloodthirsty and lustful demon at night. Halvir subdues the demon by having sex with it, and when Vald awakes, he remembers nothing. Throughout the manga, Vald and Halvir meet several new allies that accompany them in trying to defeat Vald's curse.

Characters

Leaving his kingdom to search for a cure, the prince meets the wizard, Halvir Hroptr who can tame the beast in his passionate embrace.

Searching together for a cure to end the curse that the prince is under, they encounter many adventures on their journey, falling in love in the process.

A legendary beast that was an apprentice to a powerful magician. He was rumored to have the ability to level an entire forest with a single breath. He can take two forms, a bunny-like character, and a beautiful young man. Whether in human or bunny form, he keeps the curly symbol on his forehead and his braid. He's very fond of Prince Vald, who named him  but has a frosty relationship with the wizard, Havi.

One of Celeasdiele's Wizard School's professors and Halvir's former teacher when he was 12 years old.  Before the story, he caught in a time-bubble for 10 years and was freed by Halvir.

A magician and one of the protectors of Celeasdeile, he's known Havi since childhood when they learned magic together. He joins Prince Vald's traveling group when he is ordered by the Grand Council of Celeasdeile to find Havi.

Media

Manga
Crimson Spell is written and illustrated by Ayano Yamane. It was serialized in monthly manga magazine Chara Selection from 2004 until 2021. The chapters were released in 7 bound volumes by Tokuma Shoten under the Chara Comics imprint.

In August 2006, Media Blasters announced they had licensed the series in English for North American distribution, releasing the first two volumes under the title The Crimson Spell through their Kitty Media imprint. In May 2013, Viz Media took over English distribution rights and re-released the series under its original title through their SuBLime imprint. The series was given a print release only, as Viz Media could not acquire digital distribution rights.

Drama CDs

Movic produced two audio drama adaptations of the first two volumes and released them on CD under the Chara CD Collection imprint. The first CD, adapting volume 1 of the manga, was released on June 24, 2009, and peaked at #156 on the Oricon Weekly Albums Chart on its first week of release. The second CD, adapting volume 2 of the manga, was released on March 25, 2010, peaking at #274 on the Oricon Weekly Albums Chart on its first week of release.

Reception
Julie Rosato of Mania.com criticizes the first chapter for rushing "things a bit". Holly Ellingwood of Active Anime commends the manga for going "beyond the average  to give readers a truly immersing fantasy world". She also comments on the "scorching and beautifully drawn" love scenes".

In the United States, SuBLime's translation of volume 3 debuted at #2 on The New York Times Best Seller List in the manga category,  while volumes 4 and 5 debuted at #1.

References

External links 
 

2004 manga
Action anime and manga
Fantasy anime and manga
Kitty Media
Romance anime and manga
SuBLime manga
Tokuma Shoten manga
Yaoi anime and manga